Kerend is an alternate name of Kerend-e Gharb, a city in Kermanshah Province, Iran.

Kerend or Karand or Kerand may also refer to:
 Kerend, Golestan
 Karand, Semnan
 Kerend, South Khorasan
 Kerend Rural District (disambiguation)